is a Japanese Tokusatsu television series created and produced by Toei Company. The series is the seventeenth and final installment of the Metal Hero Series franchise and the partial sequel to B-Robo Kabutack. It premiered on March 8, 1998, the week following the finale of B-Robo Kabutack and ended on January 24, 1999. It joined Seijuu Sentai Gingaman as part of the block that would ultimately become Super Hero Time in 2003. Like its predecessor, it bears some similarities with Robocon in characters and themes styles.

Plot
The story begins when the Ruling Elder of Harappa Land sent a few of his robotic people to seek out the sacred treasure of their kingdom: The Landtool. Two such robots, Robotack and Kamerock, arrived to a place called Yumegaoka. It was there that Robotack befriended a boy named Kakeru and aided the boy's uncle, Kaoru Sugi, in his Private Investigation business. But also on the quest for the LandTool is DarkCrow and his lacky Kabados, who were exiled and intend to make money off the LandTool.

Characters

Shardock P.D. Agency

The 

 : Red Wonder dog-type robot with a dog-type biochip. He came to seek out the Land Tool after arriving in Japan. He also stole Sugi's meal while on the verge of starvation and is soon drafted into the Shardock P.D. Agency in compensation for Sugi's meal. His favorite food is a sausage and ends his sentences with "Bow." When Kakeru plays the Wonder Flute, Robotack performs the Magnet Change and transforms into Special Mode from Normal Mode, but he could later transform by himself afterwards. His motif is based on the legend of Hanasaka Jiisan and his name is based on Lobo. He can replace his arms with Mog-Lucky's and add Takkard's wings to become .
 : Blue Wonder turtle-type robot with a turtle-type biochip. He came to Japan from China following Robotack. He lives in the apartment near the Shardock P.D. Agency. He is troubled by Mimeena's courting. His motif is based on the legend of Urashima Tarō. He can replace his arms with Darkrow's left arm and Kabados' right arm to become .
 : The president of Shardock P.D. Agency; he is a detective, Kakeru's uncle, and Kakeru's mother's younger brother. Forcing a request upon Kakeru and Robotack, he is working at a part-time job while bent on catching Cherry to get the 5,000 reward. He closed down the Shardock P.D. Agency and left Yumegaoka for London in the finale.

YST

The 
 : Robotack's first human friend and the leader of the YST. He plays the Wonder Flute and supports Robotack. Because his parents reside in London, he is under the care of Sugi. He left Yumegaoka for London.
 : Kakeru's classmate and a mood maker of the YST.
 : Kakeru's classmate and a member of the YST. He had a trauma due to Chinese dumplings.
 : Kakeru's classmate and a member of the YST, though technically the only female member.

Yumegaoka Police

The 
 : Green Wonder mole-type robot with a mole-type biochip. He is working under Karamatsu for the Yumegaoka police. He had worked for the Prefecture of Police in Paris, adapting a French accent as a result. Since he is mainly an underground working-type robot, his sensor causes a system error to an intense light. His name is based on "Lucky" of slang.
 : The detective who was Sugi's senpai and bent on bringing Cherry to justice. He can give off an intense light from his shaven head. He took advantage of Mog-Lucky's weakness, having him transferred to the Yumegaoka Police forcibly as his assistant. His favorite food is a takoyaki.

Yumegaoka Elementary School

The 
 : Blue and White Wonder hawk-type robot with a hawk-type biochip. He had studied to become a teacher without knowledge of the Land Tool missing. He teaches Kakeru and his friends at the Yumegaoka Elementary School. His motif is unknown.

Citizens

 : Wonder bunny-type robot with a rabbit-type biochip. She is the Wonder-type robot, but does not have the Magnet Change function. She supplies robots with the repair services. She has fallen in love with Kamerock. She ends her sentences with "Pyon." Her motif is based on the legend of The Tortoise and the Hare.
 : A poor middle-aged man who lives in the apartment. The wall of his room is sometimes broken through by robots. His favorite foods are instant noodles.

Gold Platinum P.D. Agency

The 
 : Yellow Wonder tiger-type robot with a tiger-type biochip who is the president of Gold Platinum. He is the prototype robot created by Dr. Takamine and is Robotack's elder brother robot. He has known that Robotack was his younger brother robot for some time. The creation of the tiger-type biochip by Dr. Takamine did not go smoothly, and so he had a cat-type biochip instead, but it was exchanged for the tiger-type biochip by Dr. Takamine in the finale. He is indignant to Dr. Takamine and plots the fall of Harappa. He is a Hanshin Tigers fan. He ends his sentences with "Nya." His motif is based on a tiger and a tabby cat and his name may be based on John Travolta.
 : Black Wonder crow-type robot with a crow-type biochip. The deputy branch manager of Gold Platinum's Yumagaoka Branch. Since he broke the Elder's precious vase, he was exiled from Harappa. He has rivalry with Kamerock. Although he is a crow-type robot, he has a fear of heights. He ends his sentences with "Dacchūno" or "Dacchūni." His motif is based on the folklore about a crow.
 : Orange Wonder hippopotamus-type robot with a hippopotamus-type biochip. Darkrow's follower and was too exiled from Harappa. He ends his sentences with "Dosu." Special Mode's weapon is the  ax. His motif is based on the legend of Kintarō.
 : The executive of Gold Platinum's head office who employed Darkrow and Kabados. Assuming the guise of Phantom Thief Cherry, she steals to save a church and a child care institution. She's a master of disguise and armed with a whip. During an attempt to steal a painting, she is nearly caught by Robotack and Kamerock before escaping them after she puts them on right trail to the 5th Shyubido Badge.

Others
 : The doctor of engineering who is a designer of Robotack and other robots, and Sakurako's father.

Harappa Robots
They are based on legends or myths, with some ending their sentences with onomatopoeic sound representations of the animals they are modeled after.

 : A dog-type robot. He is governing Harappa.
 : An elephant and a whale robot who appears when a Badge is found. He judges the game for CongraTrophies, his carrier unit changes into the Ranking Arena. While he gives the CondraTrophy to the winner, he executes a failure game to the losing player. His motif is based on Hindu mythology.
 : They are four baby elephant-type robots that assist Master Ranking.
 : He prepares the contests within the Ranking Arena. While Master Ranking was self-training, he worked as an assistant director of a TV station.
 : He watches players. While Master Ranking was self-training, he worked as a pool watcher.
 : He interferes players. While Master Ranking was self-training, he worked as a bodyguard of idol's on the recommendation of Reflecting Elephant.
 : He administers punishment to players. While Master Ranking was self-training, he served as a father of a church.
 : Red Wonder dog-type robot with a dog-type biochip. He is the latest model scientist robot of Harappa who is a candidate in the next senior, and he is the designer of Mightburn. Whenever he and Mightburn eat a fully ripened red Wonder Seed, they execute  into the fastest hero Speedy Wonder. He knew that Robotack and Torabolt are brothers. He ends his sentences with "Wan"(Bow-Wow). His motif is "dog and monkey"
 : Purple Wonder monkey-type robot with a monkey-type biochip who was created by Speedam, although he is evil. Whenever he and Speedam eat an unripened green Wonder Seed or a crushed, fully ripened Wonder Seed, or a dead Wonder Seed, they "Reversal Combine" into the strongest evil robot Mighty Wonder. He became a good robot by the shock of crashing into a temple bell. His favorite food is bananas. He ends his sentences with "Kī"(Monkey noise). His motif is "dog and monkey".

Tool
 : A bone-like flute which transforms Robotack into Super Mode or recharges Robotack's battery.
 : The glasses which raise up thinking power and the sense of smell.
 : The arm part which strengthens up arm strength.
 : The countermeasures to Torabolt's Land Tool.
 : A multi-cellphone. It can also release the Reversal Gattai forcibly.
 : The seed for the Reversal Gattai. It grows or dies according to singing ability. The robot which combined by the Reversal Gattai obeys the person who gave the Wonder Seed.
 : When all five Land Tools are collected, it changes into the armor for the robot. The golden Land Tool is the most important item.

Episodes
 : written by Takashi Yamada, directed by Katsuya Watanabe
 : written by Takashi Yamada, directed by Katsuya Watanabe
 : written by Junichi Miyashita, directed by Naoki Iwahara
 : written by Satoru Nishizono, directed by Naoki Iwahara
 : written by Takashi Yamada, directed by Hidenori Ishida
 : written by Takashi Yamada, directed by Hidenori Ishida
 : written by Satoru Nishizono, directed by Taro Sakamoto
 : written by Nobuo Ogizawa, directed by Taro Sakamoto
 : written by Takashi Yamada, directed by Katsuya Watanabe
 : written by Junichi Miyashita, directed by Katsuya Watanabe
 : written by Satoru Nishizono, directed by Naoki Iwahara
 : written by Toshinobu Oi, directed by Katsuya Watanabe
 : written by Takashi Yamada, directed by Hidenori Ishida
 : written by Yoshio Urasawa, directed by Hidenori Ishida
 : written by Nobuo Ogizawa, directed by Taro Sakamoto
 : written by Takashi Yamada, directed by Taro Sakamoto
 : written by Satoru Nishizono, directed by Katsuya Watanabe
 : written by Junichi Miyashita, directed by Katsuya Watanabe
 : written by Yoshio Urasawa, directed by Naoki Iwahara
 : written by Takeshi Yamada, directed by Naoki Iwahara
 : written by Takashi Yamada, directed by Taro Sakamoto
 : written by Satoru Nishizono, directed by Taro Sakamoto
 : written by Yoshio Urasawa, directed by Katsuya Watanabe
 : written by Nobuo Ogizawa, directed by Katsuya Watanabe
 : written by Junichi Miyashita, directed by Naoki Iwahara
 : written by Takashi Yamada, directed by Naoki Iwahara
 : written by Satoru Nishizono, directed by Hidenori Ishida
 : written by Takashi Yamada, directed by Hidenori Ishida
 : written by Junichi Miyashita, directed by Hidenori Ishida 
 : written by Toshinobu Oi, directed by Taro Sakamoto
 : written by Nobuo Ogizawa, directed by Taro Sakamoto
 : written by Takashi Yamada, directed by Katsuya Watanabe
 : written by Takashi Yamada, directed by Katsuya Watanabe
 : written by Satoru Nishizono, directed by Hidenori Ishida
 : written by Junichi Miyashita, directed by Hidenori Ishida
 : written by Satoru Nishizono, directed by Taro Sakamoto
 : written by Yoshio Urasawa, directed by Taro Sakamoto
 : written by Takashi Yamada, directed by Katsuya Watanabe
 : written by Junichi Miyashita, directed by Katsuya Watanabe
 : written by Satoru Nishizono, directed by Naoki Iwahara
 : written by Yoshio Urasawa, directed by Naoki Iwahara
 : written by Nobuo Ogizawa, directed by Naoki Iwahara
 : written by Junichi Miyashita, directed by Hidenori Ishida
 : written by Takashi Yamada, directed by Hidenori Ishida
 : written by Takashi Yamada, directed by Hidenori Ishida

Special

Chasing a thief who stole his Daifuku across Tetsuwan before cornering him at the Tansan Kingdom, Robotack is arrested by a pair of Baby Elephant Robo guards. Brought before the king and queen of Tansan, Robotack is given the task to find their daughter Princess Lamune. Learning that a rhinoceros-beetle-like robot kidnapped Lamune, and finding a crow's feather at the scene, Robotack goes to a stand run by Mimeena who informs him that two robots mentioned seeing the kidnapper at the Desert Town. Heading into the desert, Robotack finds the kidnapper: Kabutack. The two robots proceed to comedically fight each other before assuming their fighting forms and getting serious. But after the two knock each other out, Kabutack sees the crow feather and shows Robotack one he found while getting into a scuffle with the retainers of the dictator Torabolt over a magical shield he found. With this new info, Robotack realizes that Darkrow posed as Kabutack and kidnapped the princess.

Though Kabutack remains to continue his search for the magical sword that can counteract the shield, he has assistant Kamerock accompany Robotack to Ohedo Town where they find Lamune and her two kidnappers. As Kamerock deals with Darkrow and Kabados, Robotack saves the princess and gets her to safety while learning her abduction was orchestrated by Torabolt. At that time, Torabolt arrives and uses the shield to blast Robotack into the river as he spirits the princess away to marry her. After an amnesic misadventure involving Takard and Moglucky, Robotack is joined by the young samurai Kakeru. Sneaking into the Union of Toruboruto with the help of a padre to stop the wedding, Robotack and his friends are at a disadvantage until Kabutack arrives with the magical sword. With Kamerock taking the princess to safety, Robotack and Kabutack defeat Darkrow and Kabados. However, the two are overpowered by the summoned Mighty Wonder before they destroy both him and the shield. Robotack then sends Toraboruto flying towards his castle, causing it to explode. When he then admits his feelings for her, Robotack is shot down as Lamune tells him that her heart belongs to the knight to treated her with kindness while in Torabolt's dungeon. Robotack freaks out further when the knight turns out to be the thief,  Saburo Sazanki. After the wedding, Robotack eventually lightens up and joins in the party.

Script: Yoshio Urasawa
Director: Naoki Iwahara

Cast
Kakeru Yukiyanagi - 
Misaki Tachibana - 
Kaoru Sugi - 
Shigeru Sakaki - 
Kōta Umeda - 
Detective Karamatsu - 
Sakurako Takamine - 
Saburo Sazanka - 
Dr. Yuichiro Takamine -

Voice actors
 Robotack - 
 Kamerock - 
 Mimeena - 
 Darkrow - 
 Kabados - 
 Mog-Lucky - 
 Takkard - 
 Torabolt - 
 Speedam/Speedy Wonder -  (Played as "堀川 亮")
 Mightburn/Mighty Wonder -  (Played as "竜田 直樹")
 Baby Elephant Robots - 
 Master Ranking - 
 Elder -

Songs
Opening theme

Lyrics: 
Composition & Arrangement: 
Artist: 
Ending themes

Lyrics: 
Composition: 
Arrangement: 
Artist: 
Episodes: 1-31

Lyrics: Tamanosuke Ōga
Composition & Arrangement: 
Artist: Robotack All Stars
Episodes: 32-45

References

1998 Japanese television series debuts
1999 Japanese television series endings
Metal Hero Series
Japanese television shows featuring puppetry
TV Asahi original programming
Japanese comedy television series